The Ultimate 10-200 is a Canadian homebuilt aerobatic biplane that was designed produced by Streamline Welding of Hamilton, Ontario, introduced in the 1990s. When it was available the aircraft was supplied as a kit or in the form of plans for amateur construction.

Design and development
The aircraft started out as a replacement set of wings for the Pitts Special and eventually a new fuselage was designed to go with the wing set. The resulting aircraft features a strut-braced biplane layout, with cabane struts, interplane struts and flying wires, a single-seat, enclosed cockpit under a bubble canopy, fixed conventional landing gear with wheel pants and a single engine in tractor configuration.

The aircraft is made from metal with its flying surfaces covered in doped aircraft fabric. Its wing span is only . The acceptable power range varies by each model. Standard equipment includes an inverted fuel system and rear-hinged canopy. Operational g loads are +7 and -5 g. The aircraft has a roll rate of 360 degrees per second.

The manufacturer estimated the construction time from the supplied kit as 1200 hours.

Operational history
In March 2014 six examples were registered in the United States with the Federal Aviation Administration, although a total of 12 had been registered at one time. Also in March 2014 two were registered in Canada with Transport Canada.

Variants
Ultimate 10-180
Model powered by the  Lycoming O-360 powerplant
Ultimate 10-200
Model powered by the  Lycoming IO-360 powerplant
Ultimate 10-300
Model powered by the  Lycoming IO-540 powerplant

Specifications (Ultimate 10-200)

See also
List of aerobatic aircraft

References

External links
 Photo of an Ultimate 10-200

Ultimate
1990s Canadian sport aircraft
Single-engined tractor aircraft
Biplanes
Homebuilt aircraft
Aerobatic aircraft